Giampiero Gloder (born 15 May 1958) is an Italian prelate of the Catholic Church who has worked in the diplomatic service of the Holy See in 1993. He was named Apostolic Nuncio to Cuba in October 2019 after serving as president of the Pontifical Ecclesiastical Academy since 2013 and vice Camerlengo of the Holy Roman Church since 2014.

Biography
Gloder was born in the township of Asiago in the Italian Province of Vicenza. He was ordained a priest for the diocese of Padua on 4 June 1983. He studied dogmatic theology and then studied at the Pontifical Ecclesiastical Academy.

He entered the diplomatic service of the Holy See on 1 July 1993. He worked in Guatemala until 1995 and then in the General Affairs Office of the Secretariat of State in Rome. He was promoted to First Secretary in 1997, Counselor 2nd class in 2001, and Counselor First Class in 2005.

On 21 September 2013, Pope Francis gave him the title Apostolic Nuncio and named him President of the Pontifical Ecclesiastical Academy, succeeding Archbishop Beniamino Stella who was appointed prefect of the Congregation for the Clergy. He was also named Titular Archbishop of Telde. He was consecrated a bishop by Pope Francis on 24 October 2013.

On 13 September 2014 he was appointed a member of the Congregation for the Evangelization of Peoples. On 20 December 2014 Pope Francis named him vice Camerlengo of the Holy Roman Church.

Pope Francis appointed him Apostolic Nuncio to Cuba on 11 October 2019.

See also
 List of heads of the diplomatic missions of the Holy See

References

External links
 Catholic Hierarchy: Archbishop Giampiero Gloder

Living people
1958 births
21st-century Italian Roman Catholic titular archbishops
Apostolic Nuncios to Cuba
Presidents of the Pontifical Ecclesiastical Academy
Pontifical Ecclesiastical Academy alumni
People from Vicenza
Members of the Congregation for the Evangelization of Peoples
People from Asiago